Tilstone Fearnall is a former civil parish, now in the parishes of Tiverton and Tilstone Fearnall and Rushton, in Cheshire West and Chester, England. It contains nine buildings that are recorded in the National Heritage List for England as designated listed buildings, all of which are listed at Grade II. This grade is the lowest of the three gradings given to listed buildings and is applied to "buildings of national importance and special interest". Apart from the village of Tilstone Fearnall, the parish is rural. The Shropshire Union Canal passes through the parish, and three of the listed building are associated with it, a bridge, a lock, and a linkman's hut. The other listed buildings include a church, a vicarage, a former mill, and houses and associated structures.

References
Citations

Sources

Listed buildings in Cheshire West and Chester
Lists of listed buildings in Cheshire